Laurence Ralph Stoddard (December 22, 1903 – January 26, 1997), also known as Chick Stoddard, was an American rowing coxswain who competed in the 1924 Summer Olympics. In 1924, he coxed the American boat, which won the gold medal in the men's eight.

References

External links
 
 
 

1903 births
1997 deaths
American male rowers
Coxswains (rowing)
Olympic gold medalists for the United States in rowing
Rowers at the 1924 Summer Olympics
Medalists at the 1924 Summer Olympics
Yale University alumni